Primum may refer to :

Primum movens is a term used in the philosophical and theological cosmological argument for the existence of God. 
Quo primum is the name of an apostolic constitution in the form of a papal bull issued by Pope Pius V on 14 July 1570. 
The Primum Mobile is the outermost moving sphere in the geocentric model of the universe in medieval and Renaissance astronomy.
The septum primum is a septum which subdivides the cavity of primitive atrium into right and left chambers in the developing heart
Primum Familiae Vini is an association of family-owned wineries. 
Primum non nocere is a Latin phrase that means "First, do no harm." 
Primum Entertainment Group is a media company involved in the production and distribution of filmed entertainment properties and live events in Latin America. 
Cristilabrum primum is a species of air-breathing land snail.
Ubi Primum (disambiguation), the title of two different 19th century encyclicals.